is a Japanese economist. He is a professor of the School of International and Public Affairs, Columbia University and a senior professor of the National Graduate Institute for Policy Studies.

Career 
He graduated from the Faculty of Economics, Hitotsubashi University in 1973 and from the Graduate School of Economics in the same institute in 1975. He earned a Ph.D from Harvard University in 1979. He served as Deputy Vice Minister of Finance for International Affairs from 1999 to 2001.

A renowned expert in the 1997 Asian financial crisis, his current research focuses on international monetary policy for which he advocates increased regional integration to prevent similar crises in the future. His views have been published in some of the world's most influential media, such as The Economist. Ito was reportedly short-listed for the position of Governor of the Bank of Japan (BOJ) following Shinzo Abe's second election as Prime Minister of Japan (the position ultimately went to Haruhiko Kuroda).

Ito is also an affiliated faculty member of the Weatherhead East Asian Institute at Columbia University.

Selected publications

Books

Journal articles

References

External links 
 Web site
 Faculty profile at Columbia University
 Faculty profile at GRIPS

1950 births
Living people
People from Sapporo
20th-century Japanese economists
21st-century Japanese  economists
Hitotsubashi University alumni
Harvard University alumni
University of Minnesota faculty
Academic staff of Hitotsubashi University
Harvard University faculty
Academic staff of the University of Tokyo
Columbia University faculty
Academic staff of National Graduate Institute for Policy Studies
Fellows of the Econometric Society
Recipients of the Medal with Purple Ribbon
Presidents of the Japanese Economic Association

Weatherhead East Asian Institute faculty